Colin Robertson may refer to:

Colin Robertson (fur trader) (1783–1842), Canadian fur trader and political figure
Colin McLeod Robertson (1870–1951), British sailor
Colin Robertson (diplomat) (born 1954), Canadian diplomat
Colin Robertson (footballer) (born 1957), Australian rules footballer
Colin Robertson (cricketer) (born 1963), Zimbabwean cricketer
Colin Robertson (political activist) (born 1983), Scottish far-right polemicist and public speaker

See also
Colin Roberts (disambiguation)